Therese Åsland (born 26 August 1995) is a Norwegian footballer who plays for Brann and the Norway women's national football team. She was selected to the team representing Norway at the 2019 FIFA Women's World Cup.

Club career

Brann
In December 2021, Åsland became the first signing for the newly formed women's side of Brann.

Career statistics

References

External links
 

1995 births
Living people
Sportspeople from Stavanger
Norwegian women's footballers
Norway women's youth international footballers
Norway women's international footballers
Women's association football forwards
Toppserien players
Klepp IL players
Avaldsnes IL players
Røa IL players
LSK Kvinner FK players
SK Brann Kvinner players
2019 FIFA Women's World Cup players
Damallsvenskan players
Kristianstads DFF players